A special election was held in  on October 2, 1811 to fill a vacancy left by the resignation of John Montgomery (DR) on April 29, 1811.

Election results

Archer took his seat on November 4, 1811

See also
List of special elections to the United States House of Representatives

References

Maryland 1811 06
Maryland 1811 06
1811 06
Maryland 06
United States House of Representatives 06
United States House of Representatives 1811 06